French River 13 is an Ojibway First Nations reserve in Parry Sound District, Ontario. It is one of the reserves of the Henvey Inlet First Nation.

Demographics

References

Ojibwe reserves in Ontario
Communities in Parry Sound District
French River (Ontario)